Rosemary Hill (born 10 April 1957) is an English writer and historian.

Life
Hill has published widely on 19th- and 20th-century cultural history, but she is best known for God's Architect (2007), her biography of Augustus Pugin. The book won the Wolfson History Prize, the James Tait Black Memorial Prize, the Elizabeth Longford Prize, and the Marsh Biography Award. She is a trustee of the Victorian Society, a contributing editor to the London Review of Books, and a Quondam Fellow of All Souls College, Oxford.

Hill has been married twice. Her first husband was the poet Christopher Logue (1926–2011), whom she married in 1985; and her second was the architectural historian and journalist Gavin Stamp (1948–2017), whom she married on 10 April 2014.

References

External links
 Rosemary Hill

1957 births
Living people
English biographers
English historians
Fellows of the Royal Society of Literature
James Tait Black Memorial Prize recipients